Thomas Berry Needles (April 26, 1835 – June 4, 1914) was an American businessman and politician.

Born in Waterloo, Monroe County, Illinois, Needles went to school in Mount Sterling, Illinois. He then worked with his father in the mercantile business. He then open a store in Nashville, Washington County, Illinois and was involved with the banking business in Nashville, Illinois. Needles served as county clerk for Washington County, Illinois. Needles was involved with the Republican Party. From 1877 to 1881, Needles served as Auditor of Public Accounts, State of Illinois. In 1881, Needles served in the Illinois State Senate. In 1889, President Benjamin Harrison appointed Needles United States Marshal for the Indian Territory. From 1893 to 1897, Needles served in the Illinois House of Representatives. President William McKinley appointed Needles to the Dawes Commission. Needles died in a hospital in Saint Louis, Missouri.

Notes

External links

1835 births
1914 deaths
People from Waterloo, Illinois
People from Nashville, Illinois
Businesspeople from Illinois
County clerks in Illinois
Auditors of Public Accounts of Illinois
Republican Party members of the Illinois House of Representatives
Republican Party Illinois state senators
United States Marshals
Indian Territory officials
19th-century American businesspeople